Angraecopsis is a genus of plants in the family Orchidaceae. It was first described by Fritz Kraenzlin in 1900 and given its name on account with the genus' similarity to Angraecum species. Angraecopsis are native to Africa, Madagascar, Réunion, Mauritius and the Comoros.  The growth habit is rather small and the leaves emerge from a woody stem.

Species 
 Angraecopsis amaniensis Summerh. - from Kenya to Zimbabwe and Mozambique
 Angraecopsis breviloba Summerh. - Kenya and Tanzania
 Angraecopsis cryptantha P.J.Cribb - Cameroon
 Angraecopsis dolabriformis (Rolfe) Schltr. - São Tomé
 Angraecopsis elliptica Summerh. - from Ivory Coast to Uganda
 Angraecopsis gassneri G.Will. - Zambia
 Angraecopsis gracillima (Rolfe) Summerh. - from Uganda to Zambia
 Angraecopsis hallei Szlach. & Olszewski - Gabon
 Angraecopsis holochila Summerh. -Uganda and Ethiopia
 Angraecopsis ischnopus (Schltr.) Schltr. - Bioko, Guiana, Ivory Coast, Nigeria, Sierra Leone, Cameroon
 Angraecopsis lisowskii Szlach. & Olszewski - Cameroon
 Angraecopsis lovettii P.J.Cribb - Tanzania
 Angraecopsis macrophylla Summerh. - Ivory Coast, Uganda, Ethiopia
 Angraecopsis malawiensis P.J.Cribb in I.F.la Croix - Malawi and Tanzania
 Angraecopsis parva (P.J.Cribb) P.J.Cribb - Malawi and Tanzania
 Angraecopsis parviflora (Thouars) Schltr. - Ivory Coast, Cameroon, Tanzania, Malawi, Mozambique, Zimbabwe, Madagascar, Mauritius, Réunion 
 Angraecopsis pobeguinii  (Finet) H.Perrier - Njazidja
 Angraecopsis pusilla Summerh. - Zaire (Congo-Kinshasa, Democratic Republic of the Congo)
 Angraecopsis tenerrima Kraenzl. - Tanzania
 Angraecopsis thomensis Stévart & P.J.Cribb - - São Tomé
 Angraecopsis tridens (Lindl.) Schltr. - Bioko, Equatorial Guinea, Cameroon
 Angraecopsis trifurca (Rchb.f.) Schltr. - Ethiopia, Zimbabwe, Comoros

References 

 

 
Vandeae genera
Orchids of Madagascar
Orchids of Réunion
Flora of Mauritius
Flora of the Comoros
Orchids of Africa
Taxonomy articles created by Polbot
Taxa named by Friedrich Wilhelm Ludwig Kraenzlin